Water polo is inducted in the Pan American Games since the first edition of the multi-sports event in 1951, when Buenos Aires was the host. The women's event made its debut in 1999. The United States is the most successful country, winning 16 out of 22 tournaments.

Men's tournament

Participating nations

Women's tournament

Participating nations

Medal table

See also
 UANA Water Polo Cup
 Swimming Union of the Americas

References
Sports123

 
Sports at the Pan American Games
Pan American Games
Pan American Games